The Port of Shëngjin or Shëngjin Harbor is a port of Albania in the city of Shëngjin, Albania.

See also
Port of Durrës
Port of Vlorë
Port of Sarandë
Orikum Marina

External links
Port homepage

References

Shëngjin
Shengjin